Hemicordylus nebulosus is a species of lizard in the Cordylidae family.
It is endemic to South Africa on the mist belt of northern slope of the Hottentots Holland Mountains. The scientific name, H. nebulosus means cloud or dark crag lizard. The name was given due to the melanistic body color. Other names include the dwarf cliff lizard, dwarf crag lizard, dark crag lizard and the cloudy crag lizard.

References

Sources
 Hemicordylus resurrected: Stanley et al., 2011, Between a rock and a hard polytomy: Rapid radiation in the rupicolous girdled lizards (Squamata: Cordylidae)
 

Hemicordylus
Endemic reptiles of South Africa
Reptiles described in 1995
Taxa named by Pieter Le Fras Nortier Mouton
Taxa named by Johannes H. van Wyk
Taxonomy articles created by Polbot